Hurricane Cindy was a tropical cyclone that briefly reached minimal hurricane strength in the Gulf of Mexico during July in the 2005 Atlantic hurricane season and made landfall in Louisiana. It was the third named storm and first hurricane of the season. Cindy was originally thought to have been a tropical storm at peak strength, but was upgraded to a Category 1 hurricane in the post-season analysis. Cindy formed on July 3 just east of the Yucatán Peninsula in the Caribbean Sea. The depression soon made landfall on the peninsula and weakened before reemerging in the Gulf of Mexico on July 4. The storm strengthened as it moved north becoming a hurricane just before making landfall near Grand Isle, Louisiana, on July 5. The storm weakened as it moved overland and became extratropical on July 7.

The storm was responsible for 3 deaths in the United States and brought heavy rains to Louisiana, Mississippi, Alabama and Maryland. An unusually strong F2 tornado was spawned from Cindy's remnants and caused severe damage in Hampton, Georgia. Cindy also caused flooding and a severe blackout in New Orleans, Louisiana.

Meteorological history 

On June 24 a vigorous tropical wave moved off the African coast and quickly west across the Atlantic without developing. The wave gradually became more organized as it crossed the Caribbean and late on July 3 it strengthened into Tropical Depression Three about 80 miles (130 km) East of Chetumal, Mexico. The models initially had difficulty predicting the track of the depression and the forecasts from the National Hurricane Center reflected this, indicating that the depression would move towards Texas. The depression developed quickly before making landfall on Yucatán Peninsula early on July 4 with 35 mph (55 km/h) winds and began to lose its circulation overland. A new center of circulation began forming later on July 4, over the Gulf of Mexico, to the north of the original center. This reformation caused a significant alteration in the forecast models, which now indicated a landfall in Louisiana. The depression moved northwards into the Gulf of Mexico and became a tropical storm early on July 5, assigned the name Cindy. 

Lower shear allowed Cindy to strengthen further as it approached Louisiana and the storm was a minimal hurricane with 75 mph (120 km/h) winds when it made landfall near Grand Isle late on July 5. Initially it was stated that Cindy did not reach hurricane strength, but post-season reanalysis confirmed the upgrade to Category 1 status. Cindy weakened back into a tropical storm as it crossed over extreme southeastern Louisiana and Breton Sound before making a second landfall near Waveland, Mississippi with 50 mph (85 km/h) winds on July 6. Cindy moved to the northeast over Mississippi and Alabama, weakening to a tropical depression that day. The depression became extratropical over the Carolinas on July 7 and moved to the northeast dissipating in the Gulf of St Lawrence on July 12.

Preparations 

Upon being declared a tropical depression, meteorologists in Mexico began advising residents about the possibility of heavy rainfall across the Yucatán Peninsula.

The National Hurricane Center issued a Tropical Storm Warning from Morgan City, Louisiana to Destin, Florida, and both tourists and residents evacuated the Louisiana and Florida coasts. Workers were evacuated from six oil rigs in the storm's path, and 23 coastal refineries stopped unloading oil as Cindy's approach made such activities dangerous. Numerous flights in and out of New Orleans were cancelled and Amtrak suspended passenger rail service until after the storm passed. Recreational vehicles were told to leave Grand Isle in case a full-scale evacuation was needed. In Mississippi, jail inmates filled sandbags which would be distributed to flood prone areas throughout the state.

Impact 

Three deaths were attributed to Cindy, none of them near the storm's landfall. One person was killed in Georgia, and two in Maryland from a car crash. Approximately 300,000 homes and businesses in southeast Louisiana and the Mississippi Gulf Coast lost electrical power and a storm surge of 4–6 feet (1.2-1.8 m) affected the same area, causing some beach erosion near Grand Isle, Louisiana. Hurricane Cindy's total damage was estimated to be US$320 million.

In New Orleans, Louisiana, wind gusts reached 70 mph (110 km/h), many trees were damaged or uprooted and scattered street flooding was reported. As thousands lost electrical power, the city experienced its worst blackout since Hurricane Betsy 40 years earlier. Although still listed as a "Tropical Storm" by the weather service at the time, many laypeople in New Orleans were under the impression that Cindy was a hurricane, and referred to it as "Hurricane Cindy" before it was officially upgraded. Many people in the New Orleans metropolitan area expected minimal effects from the storm, but were cleaning up debris and were without power for days after Cindy's passage. In Louisiana, 260,000 residences were left without power.

Even though it had weakened to a depression when it moved inland, Cindy's effects were still significant across the final portion of its track. The day after its landfall in southeastern Louisiana, Tropical Depression Cindy reached central Alabama. There its rainbands produced heavy rainfall and eight tornadoes. Damage was mostly limited to trees and powerlines, but an F1 tornado in Macon county injured one man, destroyed an auto-repair shop, and damaged several nearby cars. About 35,000 residences in Alabama and 7,000 in both Florida and Mississippi were left without power following the storm.

On July 6 at 8:45pm (EST), a large, half-mile-wide tornado touched down near the Atlanta Motor Speedway. The tornado was estimated to have had winds of 120 mph as it tore through the complex, making it an F2 on the Fujita scale. Every building had sustained at least minor damage and some that were damaged beyond repair. On some of the condominiums, the roof had caved in. Most structures had their windows blown out. The five-story scoreboard was blown down as well. The track was not damaged, however, debris was littered all over it. The tornado continued on its path of destruction towards the Tara Field Airport, west of the speedway. There, eleven planes and five vintage helicopters were damaged. The tornado then moved towards the Edgar Blalock Raw Water Reservation. At this point, the tornado had already been weakening and shrinking. The tornado turned to the northwest and crossed into Clayton County. The tornado lifted shortly after at around 9:04 p.m. (EST). Damage from the tornado was extensive. About $40 million in damages was caused to the Speedway as many buildings needed to be torn down and rebuilt. Nearby the airport, a Chevron Auto service station was destroyed and at least 60 homes were severely damaged and over 200 others damaged along the tornados' nine-mile track. Power to most of Henry County was out due to the damage. Following the tornado, all races scheduled to take place for several weeks were cancelled; the first race after the repair work was finished was to take place on October 30.

Elsewhere in Georgia, an F1 tornado in Fayette county damaged three homes and caused an estimated US$3 million of damage. Four other tornadoes were confirmed across the state, although none of them caused significant damage. Hartsfield-Jackson Atlanta International Airport in Atlanta recorded over 5 inches (130 mm) of rain on July 6, its sixth-highest one-day rainfall since records began in 1878; most of the rain fell during just two hours (8–10  p.m. EDT). This is more rain than the area normally gets in all of July. Due to the rain, the Atlanta Braves game against the Chicago Cubs was postponed.

Cindy's remnant low moving across western and northern North Carolina combined with a frontal boundary to produce several supercell thunderstorms. These supercells spawned a number of tornadoes in western North Carolina, at the foothills of the Appalachian mountains, but their effects were minimal. Continuing north, Cindy brought over 5 in (125 mm) of rain to areas as distant as Salisbury, Maryland. In addition, Cindy's remnants produce moderate rainfall in Upstate New York causing light damage due to flooding and gusty winds, which downed some trees.

Tornadoes
As the remnants of Cindy weakened over Louisiana, it led to a two-day tornado outbreak across the southeastern United States. Strong thunderstorms began to develop along the edges of the system in Alabama. The first tornado touched down near Semmes, Alabama at 3:00a.m. (CST). The tornado caused roof damage to several structures as well as knocking down several trees. Over the next ten hours, several F0 and two F1 tornadoes touched down in Alabama and Florida. Later on July 6, the remnants of Cindy were moving over Alabama and the activity shifted into Georgia. At 8:45pm (EST), a large tornado touched down near the Atlanta Motor Speedway causing severe damage to the structures in the complex. The tornado then moved into an airfield where several planes and helicopters were damaged. Numerous homes were damaged or destroyed by the tornado as well. The tornado was rated F2 by the NWS. The activity slowed for a short while before picking back up in early afternoon hours on July 7 as the remnants of Cindy moved through Georgia. At 2:10PM (EST) an F2 tornado touched down about seven miles south of Taylorsville, North Carolina where three buildings were damaged a mobile home was destroyed. About an hour later, another F2 tornado touched down in North Carolina. It touched down about four miles north-northeast of Harmony. The tornado damaged several buildings before moving into Yadkin County where an additional 13 buildings were damaged as well as severe crop damage to the tobacco and corn farms. By the nighttime hours, the activity was shifting into Virginia. Before the remnants of Cindy moved out into the Atlantic Ocean, seven F1 tornadoes touched down in Virginia. The outbreak ended early on July 8 as Cindy began to move out over the Atlantic.

Atlanta Motor Speedway, Georgia

On July 6 at 8:45pm (EST), a large, half-mile-wide tornado touched down near the Atlanta Motor Speedway. The tornado was estimated to have had winds of 120 mph as it tore through the complex. Every building had sustained at least minor damage and some that were damaged beyond repair. On some of the condominiums, the roof had caved in. Most structures had their windows blown out. The five-story scoreboard was blown down as well. The track was not damaged, however, debris was littered all over it. The tornado continued on its path of destruction towards the Tara Field Airport, west of the speedway. There, eleven planes and five vintage helicopters were damaged. The tornado then moved towards the Edgar Blalock Raw Water Reservation. At this point, the tornado had already been weakening and shrinking. The tornado turned to the northwest and crossed into Clayton County. The tornado lifted shortly after at around 9:04 p.m. (EST).

Damage from the tornado was extensive. About $40 million in damages was caused to the Speedway as many buildings needed to be torn down and rebuilt. Nearby the airport, a Chevron Auto service station was destroyed and at least 60 homes were severely damaged and over 200 others damaged along the tornados' nine-mile track. Power to most of Henry County was out due to the damage.

Following the tornado, all races scheduled to take place for several weeks were cancelled; the first race after the repair work was finished was to take place on October 30.

In all, the tornado caused $71.5 million in damages and despite all the devastation, no one was injured by the tornado.

See also 

 List of Florida hurricanes (2000–present)
 List of North Carolina hurricanes (2000–present)
 List of Category 1 Atlantic hurricanes
 Tropical Storm Arlene (2005) – Affected similar areas earlier in the year.
 Hurricane Barry (2019)

References

External links 

 The NHC's .
 The NHC's archive on Hurricane Cindy.
 The HPC's archive on Hurricane Cindy.
 USA Today: Tropical Storm Cindy floods streets along Gulf Coast 
 Photos of Cindy on al.com
 Times-Picayune article the following day via ohsep.louisiana.gov
 NASA article on Cindy's rainfall

2005 Atlantic hurricane season
Category 1 Atlantic hurricanes
Atlantic hurricanes in Mexico
Hurricanes in Louisiana
Hurricane Cindy
Hurricane Cindy
July 2005 events in North America
Cindy